Shellac is an American noise rock band from Chicago, Illinois, composed of Steve Albini (guitar and vocals), Bob Weston (bass guitar and vocals) and Todd Trainer (drums and vocals) and formed in 1992.

They have been classified as post-hardcore and math rock, but describe themselves as a "minimalist rock trio."

Biography
Shellac formed in Chicago, Illinois, in 1992 as an informal collaboration between guitarist Steve Albini and drummer Todd Trainer.  Former Naked Raygun bassist Camilo Gonzalez sat in on early rehearsals and played on one song on Shellac's first single before permanent bassist Bob Weston joined.

Shellac has a distinctive, minimalist sound based on asymmetric time signatures, repetitive rhythms, an angular guitar sound, and both Albini's and Weston's surreal, bitingly sarcastic lyrics. Songs typically do not have traditional verse/chorus/verse structure and the arrangements are sparse, to the point where some describe them as "amelodic". Shellac's signature sound is often associated with their enthusiasm for vintage Travis Bean guitars, a rare brand of aluminium-necked instruments, and the Interfax "Harmonic Percolator" distortion pedal. Albini is known to use copper plectrums and typically wraps his guitar strap around his waist rather than over his shoulder. The band prefers the intimacy of smaller clubs and live appearances are sporadic.

Both Weston and Albini are recording engineers. They prefer a sparse, analog recording sound with little or no overdubbing, and are meticulous about microphone placement and choice of equipment.

Mid-set in many live performances Shellac take the time for one or more "question and answer" sessions, where members of the band respond in an off-the-cuff and, at times, jocular manner to questions shouted out by fans and hecklers alike.

Shellac made an early decision to not play at festivals, and this position was articulated to All Tomorrow's Parties (ATP) festival organizer Barry Hogan during the preparation stage of the inaugural ATP event. However, Scottish band Mogwai, curating the festival, convinced Albini to perform: "They (ATP) completely changed the festival game. Now the whole world has to operate under the knowledge that there are these cool, curated festivals where everyone is treated well and the experience is a generally pleasant one." In 2002, the band curated the All Tomorrow's Parties festival in Camber Sands, England. Knowing that most of the audience had come specifically to see Shellac, the band went on first every morning as an incentive for the festival-goers to be up in time to see the other acts. A CD of tracks from the bands performing at the festival was released on ATP Records.

To celebrate their 20th anniversary as a band, Shellac returned to ATP to curate once more in December 2012 with the line-up including Wire, Scrawl, Mission Of Burma, The Ex + Brass Unbound, Red Fang, Shannon Wright, The Membranes, Alix, Bear Claw, Helen Money, Dead Rider, Arcwelder, Neurosis, Mono, Melt Banana, Uzeda, Prinzhorn Dance School, Three Second Kiss, Buke and Gase, Oxbow, Nina Nastasia, Zeni Geva, Bottomless Pit, Pinebender, STNNNG and more.

In April 2013, Albini stated that a fifth Shellac LP was "just about finished" although it had "no projected release date". It would "most likely" feature nine songs and be released on Touch and Go Records despite the considerable downsizing that the label has undergone.

In November 2013, the band played the final holiday camp edition of the All Tomorrow's Parties festival in Camber Sands, England.

The band's fifth LP, Dude Incredible, was released on September 16, 2014. Steve Albini went over each song on the album with Exclaim magazine.

A collection of the band's two Peel Sessions from 1994 and 2004, entitled The End of Radio was released on June 14th, 2019.

Legacy

Writing for Drowned in Sound, Benjamin Bland said that, "Big Black and Shellac are surely the two most influential 'noise rock' groups there have ever been. Hundreds of bands have sounded like them, and in all probability so will hundreds more. Who can blame them? When a shadow that large looms over an entire subgenre of music, it’s hard not to be influenced by it, let alone ignore it altogether."

John Robb, music critic and frontman of British post-punk band The Membranes, called Shellac "the finest rock band on the planet. This is the rock band that the rest of us in our bands [...] have had to measure ourselves against and if we are found wanting then we have to cower behind rocks and attempt to revive our measly offerings until they measure up."  Vish Khanna expanded on their influence, noting that "[t]he band's sense of empathy, great storytelling, interpersonal politics and black humour are not necessarily uncommon in post-punk noise-rock bands, but Shellac's path is likely the most distinctive and emulated one." 

Christian Lemach of Whores called At Action Park his favorite noise rock album of all time. Mike Sullivan of Russian Circles cited the album as a major influence on his guitar-playing, noting that it "literally changed the way [he] looked at music". The band has also been cited as an influence by Future Of The Left (who have been described with the moniker "Poundland Shellac"), Kurt Ballou of Converge, Mono, Swing Kids, Karin Dreijer of The Knife, Gilla Band, Black Country, New Road, Jehnny Beth of Savages, Silverchair, My Disco, Gengahr, Dredg, Suicide Dolls, Echo Is Your Love, The Futureheads, KEN Mode and Pile.

Shellac was honored with a star on the outside mural of the Minneapolis nightclub First Avenue, recognizing performers that have played sold-out shows or have otherwise demonstrated a major contribution to the culture at the iconic venue. Receiving a star "might be the most prestigious public honor an artist can receive in Minneapolis," according to journalist Steve Marsh.

Discography

At Action Park (1994)
Terraform (1998)
1000 Hurts (2000)
Excellent Italian Greyhound (2007)
Dude Incredible (2014)

Equipment
 A detailed gear diagram of Steve Albini's 2000 Shellac guitar rig was available.

 A detailed gear diagram of Bob Weston's 2000 Shellac bass rig was available.

References

External links

Official (Touch & Go Records) website
Action Park: Incomplete Discography
Southern Records biography page
Steve Albini's studio

American art rock groups
American musical trios
American noise rock music groups
Musical groups from Chicago
Musical groups established in 1992
American post-hardcore musical groups
Touch and Go Records artists
Drag City (record label) artists